Sprague Glacier is a small cirque glacier in Rocky Mountain National Park in the U.S. state of Colorado. Several small alpine lakes are near the foot of the glacier.

See also
List of glaciers in the United States

References

Glaciers of Colorado
Landforms of Larimer County, Colorado